TEDx Tarfaya is a TED conference organized locally by the city of Tarfaya, Morocco. It's the first of its kind in the Sahara. The inaugural TEDx Tarfaya conference was held on May 4, 2013 at the Antoine de Saint-Exupery Museum.

Background 
TED is an acronym for "Technology, Entertainment, and Design," and TED conferences are sponsored by the Sapling Foundation, an American non-profit organization whose motto is "ideas worth sharing."

In 2009, TED started granting licenses to independent third-party organizations to organize TED conferences worldwide under the name "TEDx." These are programs consisting of organized local events in which people gather to share an experience similar to the TED in that they are led by the principle of "ideas worth sharing." In TEDx events, televised conversations are combined with speeches in front of live audiences, with the purpose of generating profound discussion and connection within a small group. The x in TEDx represents the fact that these events are independently organized.

It is forbidden for TEDx conference organizers to profit financially from running the events, though they are allowed to charge entrance fees (up to $100) to cover the operational costs of the conference. The licenses are free, but TED runs inspections before granting them, as there are conditions that must be met. TEDx does not pay speakers, and it must consent to releasing the right to edit, distribute, and present materials from the conference according to Creative Commons licensing. By late 2012, more than 16,000 "TED Talks" had been presented in over 5,000 TEDx conferences in 1,200 cities in 133 countries.

Team 
TEDx conferences are usually organized by volunteers divided into specific teams:

 Board
 Logistics Team
 Sponsoring team
 Registration Team
 Speakers Organizing Team
 Entertainment Team
 Media Team
 Social Media Team
 Stage Preparation Team
 Designing Team
 Photographers Team
 Web Developing Team

TEDx Tarfaya 2013 
The TEDx Tarfaya conference was held on May 4, 2013 in the hall of the Antoine de Saint-Exupery Museum. There were 6 speakers:

 Julio Barbosa.
 Sabine Blan
 Ghizlan Ishodar
 Murabihi Rab Shiba
 As-Salek Ayusa
 François Bastide

The first edition of the TEDx Tarfaya conference was overseen by a group of volunteers divided into the following teams:

 Logistics Team led by Muhammad Saalem El Wali El Alaoui
 Speakers Organizing Team led by El Wali El Alaoui
 Social Media Team led by Asselik Ad-Daoudi
 Stage Preparation Team led by Mustafa Ad-Demnati
 Photographers Team led by Hassan Affan

See also 
 Sapling Foundation

References

Tarfaya
TEDx conferences